Gardiner Public Schools is a school district headquartered in Gardiner, Montana.

The district serves Gardiner with additional students from Mammoth, Wyoming.  the entire district has about 200 students.

All students are in one building, with Gardiner High School being one of the divisions.

References

External links
 Gardiner Public Schools
School districts in Montana
Education in Park County, Montana